National Council of Women was a women's organization in Chile, founded in 1919.  It was one of the first women's organizations in Chile.  

The National Council of Women was created by the merge of two women's organizations founded in 1915: the Women's Reading Circle, founded in Santiago by Amanda Labarca, and the Club de Senoras (Women's Club), a women's reading circle founded by upper-class women.  Both promoted women's suffrage, and when the Women's Club asked the Conservative Party to support women's suffrage, they were threatened by the church with excommunication.   After this, the two women's organizations merged to found the National Council of Women in 1919.  

It was not the only woman's organization, as the Civico Femeninio (Women's Civic Party) was founded the same year, but it was to be the dominant women's organization in Chile.  It was also the first organized women's suffrage organization in Chile.  It also worked for a change of the civil code to improve women's rights, particularly to abolish the patria potestad, in which women were under the guardianship of their husbands.  It promoted a moderate and gradual progression toward equality. In accordance with this, they supported that the suffrage be introduced gradually, with municipal suffrage introduced before full national suffrage.

References

Organizations established in 1919
Women's rights organizations
Women's organisations based in Chile
1919 establishments in Chile
Feminist organisations in Chile
Women's suffrage in Chile